John E. Blakeley (1 October 1888 – 20 February 1958) was a British film producer, director and screenwriter, the founder of Mancunian Films.

Born in Ardwick, Manchester, son of James Blakeley (born c. 1862; Manchester), and Margaret Quirk (born c. 1861; Glasgow, Scotland), he was of Lancashire (Church of England) descent on his father's side of the family and Irish Catholic on his mother's.  His father had become an early film distributor in 1908 after previous work as a travelling draper. Blakeley joined his father's business and soon came to understand the tastes of the emerging cinema audiences in the northern industrial towns. By the 1930s, the younger Blakeley was making films starring the idols of northern music hall comedy: George Formby, Frank Randle and Sandy Powell.

Initially relying on studios in London, rising costs encouraged him to found the Mancunian Film Studios in his hometown in 1947. With £70,000 capital, a former Methodist chapel on Dickenson Road in Rusholme was converted into a film studio. The studios produced a sequence of profitable films, often on shoestring budgets, until Blakeley's retirement in 1953. He died in Stockport aged 69.

Filmography

Director
 Dodging the Dole (1936)
 Somewhere in England (1940)
 Somewhere in Camp (1942)
 Somewhere on Leave (1942)
 Home Sweet Home (1945)
 Demobbed (1946)
 Under New Management (1946)
 Holidays with Pay (1948)
 Cup-Tie Honeymoon (1948)
 What a Carry On! (1949)
 Somewhere in Politics (1949)
 School for Randle (1949)
 Over the Garden Wall (1950)
 Let's Have a Murder (1950)
 It's a Grand Life (1953)

Producer
 The Penny Pool (1937)
 Calling All Crooks (1938)

Bibliography
Williams, Philip Martin & David L. (2001) New Edition (2006) Hooray for Jollywood - The Life of John E. Blakeley & The Mancunian Film Corporation

References

External links

Biography from the British Film Institute

1888 births
1958 deaths
People from Ardwick
English film producers
20th-century English businesspeople